Dinah Lynne Birch  (born 4 October 1953) is an English literary critic.  She is Pro-Vice-Chancellor for Research and Impact and Professor of English Literature at the University of Liverpool. She was a student at St Hugh's College, Oxford and also undertook her doctorate at the University of Oxford. In 1980 she became the first woman to be elected to the Governing Body of Merton College.

Her work has been primarily on Victorian literature, and among the authors on whom she has published writings are Charles Dickens, Charlotte Brontë, Emily Brontë, and Alfred Tennyson. She has also edited two books on the Victorian critic John Ruskin: Ruskin and Gender (2002) and John Ruskin: Selected Writings (2004). Birch is serving as the General Editor of the 2012 edition of the Oxford Companion to English Literature. She is the author of Our Victorian Education (2008), writes regularly for the TLS and the LRB, and contributes to arts programmes on radio and television.

In December 2011, Birch was named as a member of the jury for the 2012 Man Booker Prize. Jury chair Sir Peter Stothard called her "[one] of Britain's finest professional critics". She is married and has two adult children. Birch lists Middlemarch by George Eliot as her favourite book. She is also a Companion of the Guild of St George.

Birch was appointed Commander of the Order of the British Empire (CBE) in the 2016 Birthday Honours for services to higher education, literary scholarship, and cultural life.

References

1953 births
Alumni of St Hugh's College, Oxford
Academics of the University of Liverpool
English literary critics
Women literary critics
Living people
Guild of St George
Fellows of Merton College, Oxford
Commanders of the Order of the British Empire